House of Councillors elections were held in Japan on 7 July 1968, electing half the seats in the House. The Liberal Democratic Party won the most seats, although this marked the first House of Councillors election in the LDP's history in which its share of the popular vote decreased when compared to the election prior to it.

Results

By constituency

References

Japan
House of Councillors (Japan) elections
1968 elections in Japan
July 1968 events in Asia
Election and referendum articles with incomplete results